Hedi Schneider Is Stuck is a 2015 German comedy film directed by Sonja Heiss.

Cast 
 Laura Tonke - Hedi Schneider
 Hans Löw - Uli
 Leander Nitsche - Finn
  - Viviane 
 Simon Schwarz - Arne Lange
  - Hedi's mother
  - Herr Schild

References

External links 

2015 comedy films
German comedy films
Norwegian comedy films
2010s German films